Jennifer Sharp is a female beach volleyball player from the United States who participated at the NORCECA Circuit 2009 at Cayman Islands playing with Jennifer Lombardi. They finished in the 8th position.

References

External links
 
 Jennifer Sharp at the Association of Volleyball Professionals (archived)

1974 births
Living people
American women's beach volleyball players
21st-century American women